Thomas Henry Bailey (1888 – after 1914) was an English footballer who played for Lincoln City and Stoke.

Career
Bailey was born in Burton upon Trent and played for Overseal Swifts and Burton United before joining Lincoln City in 1907. He played once for Lincoln before playing for Walsall and Stoke Priory and signed for Stoke in 1912. He played 36 times for Stoke in three seasons scoring once against Caerphilly.

He was, from August 1925 to May 1938, manager of Crewe Alexandra.

Career statistics
Source:

References

1888 births
Year of death missing
Sportspeople from Burton upon Trent
English footballers
Association football wing halves
Overseal Swifts F.C. players
Burton United F.C. players
Lincoln City F.C. players
Walsall F.C. players
Stoke City F.C. players
English Football League players
English football managers
Crewe Alexandra F.C. managers